Jean-Marie-Joseph-Augustin Pasquier (July 31, 1924 – May 7, 2004) was a French Catholic bishop who served in Camerron.

Ordained to the priesthood in 1950, Pasquier was named auxiliary Bishop of Garoua in 1969 and then appointed the first bishop of the Roman Catholic Diocese of Ngaoundéré, Cameroon, in 1982. Pasquiere retired in 2000.

Notes

1924 births
2004 deaths
20th-century Roman Catholic bishops in Cameroon
Roman Catholic bishops of Ngaoundéré
Roman Catholic bishops of Garoua
French expatriates in Cameroon
French Roman Catholic bishops in Africa